The bass sarrusophone is the bass member of the sarrusophone family of metal double reed conical bore wind instruments. Pitched in the key of B♭, it has a range almost identical to the bass saxophone, and can cover the bassoon range up to F.

Historically it was built in the late 19th and early 20th centuries principally by its inventor Gautrot and his successor Couesnon & Co., as well as Evette & Schaeffer (now Buffet Crampon) and Orsi of Milan. It is currently only available by custom order from Orsi.

There is very little repertoire specifically for bass sarrusophone; Roupen Shakarian has written a piece for it called Sarruso Rex.

References

Sarrusophones
Single oboes with conical bore